Euphaedra uniformis is a butterfly in the family Nymphalidae. It is found in Cameroon, Gabon and the northern part of the Democratic Republic of the Congo. The habitat consists of wet forests.

References

Butterflies described in 1981
uniformis